Tyler Morris Bashlor (born April 16, 1993) is an American professional baseball pitcher who is currently a free agent. He has played in Major League Baseball (MLB) for the New York Mets and Pittsburgh Pirates.

Career
Bashlor grew up in Springfield, Georgia and attended Calvary Day Baptist School in Savannah and played college baseball at South Georgia College. In 2013, his sophomore year at South Georgia, he went 5–3 with a 3.20 ERA and 79 strikeouts in 50.2 innings.

New York Mets
He was drafted by the New York Mets in the 11th round of the 2013 Major League Baseball draft. He signed and made his professional debut with the Kingsport Mets, posting a 5.74 ERA with 18 strikeouts in 15.2 innings pitched.

Bashlor underwent Tommy John Surgery in 2014 and missed both that year and the 2015 season. He made his return in 2016 with the Columbia Fireflies and was promoted to the St. Lucie Mets during the season. In 38 relief appearances between the two teams, he went 4–3 with a 2.75 ERA and 1.24 WHIP. He pitched 2017 with St. Lucie and the Binghamton Rumble Ponies, compiling a combined 3–2 record and 3.44 ERA with 84 strikeouts in 49.2 total innings pitched between the two teams. The Mets added him to their 40-man roster after the 2017 season.

Bashlor began 2018 with Binghamton. The Mets promoted him to the major leagues on June 25, 2018. Bashlor made his Major League debut on June 25 at Citi Field against the Pittsburgh Pirates. In two innings he allowed only one walk and a subsequent hit, a home run by Josh Bell.

Bashlor was designated for assignment on July 28, 2020.

Pittsburgh Pirates
On August 2, 2020, Bashlor was traded to the Pittsburgh Pirates for cash considerations.

In early September 2020 with just a few weeks left of the season, he was placed on the 10-day injured list with low back inflammation. At the time of his injury, Bashlor had recorded an ugly 8.64 ERA with 6 strikeouts in 8.1 innings pitched.

On April 4, 2021, Bashlor was designated for assignment to make room on the roster for Wilmer Difo. Bashlor was released by the Pirates the same day. He was sent to the Pirates Alternate Training Site on April 10.

Minnesota Twins
On March 30, 2022, Bashlor signed a minor league contract with the Minnesota Twins organization. He was released on July 16, 2022.

References

External links

1993 births
Living people
Baseball players from Georgia (U.S. state)
People from Effingham County, Georgia
Major League Baseball pitchers
New York Mets players
Pittsburgh Pirates players
South Georgia Tigers baseball players
Kingsport Mets players
Columbia Fireflies players
St. Lucie Mets players
Binghamton Rumble Ponies players
Syracuse Mets players
Toros del Este players
American expatriate baseball players in the Dominican Republic
Indianapolis Indians players